Gold is a compilation album by German hard rock band Scorpions. It was released in 2006 on Hip-O Records.

Background
The record, released as part of the Gold album series, is one of the group's few career-spanning sets. It features the Scorpions' better-known Mercury Records material, as well as earlier tunes with Uli Jon Roth.

Although Gold was released in 2006, it spanned the era between 1972 and 2002. It culled at least one song from all but two studio albums during that period, while also adding several studio tracks previously released on compilations (although "Over the Top" was not released on 1995 European edition of Deadly Sting) and one live track. Songs from the album Pure Instinct (1996) and Eye II Eye (1999) were not represented in this release.

Track listing

Disc one

Disc two

Scorpions
2006 greatest hits albums
Scorpions (band) compilation albums
Hip-O Records compilation albums